Cochrane Street is a hilly street between Queen's Road Central and the junction with Gage Street and Lyndhurst Terrace in Central, Hong Kong. The whole street hosts the Central–Mid-Levels escalators.

Name
The street was named after Thomas John Cochrane, a Rear Admiral of Second in Command (1842–44) and commander-in-chief (1844–46) in East Indies and China Station of Royal Navy. At the time, he stayed in Hong Kong.

History
The street is near the Central Market across the Queen's Road. Cochrane Street was at the build-up area of Cantonese residents. It was re-zoned in 1844 under the administration of Henry Pottinger to improve the hygiene condition of water supply. The Cantonese residents was later removed to Tai Ping Shan area.

At about 11pm on 14 August 1901, two houses at No. 32 and 34 of Cochrane Street collapsed suddenly, claiming 43 lives.

Features
The street runs uphill and many restaurants are on this street.

See also
 List of restaurant districts and streets
 List of streets and roads in Hong Kong

References

External links

 

Central, Hong Kong
Restaurant districts and streets in Hong Kong
Roads on Hong Kong Island